The GE-200 series was a family of small mainframe computers of the 1960s, built by General Electric (GE). GE marketing called the line Compatibles/200 (GE-205/215/225/235). The GE-210 of 1960 was not compatible with the rest of the 200 series.

200 series models 
The main machine in the line was the GE-225 (1961). It used a 20-bit word, of which 13 bits could be used for an address. Along with the basic central processing unit (CPU) the system could also have had a floating-point unit (the "Auxiliary Arithmetic Unit"), or a fixed-point decimal option with three six-bit decimal digits per word. It had eleven I/O channel controllers, and GE sold a variety of add-ons including disks, printers, and other devices. The machines were built using discrete transistors, with a typical machine containing about 10,000 transistors and 20,000 diodes. They used magnetic-core memory, and a standard 8 kiloword system held 186,000 magnetic cores.

The GE-215 (1963) was a scaled-down version of the GE-225, including only six I/O channels and only 4 kilowords or 8 kilowords of core.

The GE-205 (1964).

The GE-235 (1964) was a re-implementation of the GE-225 with three times faster memory than the original. The GE-235 consisted of several major components and options:
 Central processor
 400 card-per-minute (CPM) or 1000 CPM card reader
 100 CPM card punch or 300 CPM card punch
 Perforated tape subsystem
 Magnetic tape subsystem
 12-pocket high-speed document handler
 On-line high speed printer or off/on-line speed printer
 Disc storage unit
 Auxiliary Arithmetic Logic Unit (ALU)
 DATANET data communications equipment

Background
The series was designed by a team led by Homer R. “Barney” Oldfield, and which included Arnold Spielberg (father of film director Steven Spielberg). GE chairman Ralph J. Cordiner had forbidden GE from entering the general purpose computer business, rejecting several proposals by Oldfield by simply writing "No" across them and sending them back. Oldfield, somewhat deceptively, claimed that the GE-200 series would be industrial control computers. By the time Cordiner found out otherwise, it was too late and the machine was in production; Cordiner fired Oldfield at the product rollout. Even though the machine was selling well, Cordiner ordered that GE leave the computer business within 18 months (it actually took several years).

DTSS
Through the early 1960s GE worked with Dartmouth College on the development of a time-sharing operating system, which would later go on to become the Dartmouth Time Sharing System (DTSS). The system was constructed by attaching a number of teletypewriters to a smaller GE machine called the DATANET-30 (DN-30), which was a small computer that had evolved from an earlier process-control machine.

DTSS actually ran on the DN-30. The DN-30 accepted commands one at a time from the terminals connected to it, and then ran their requested programs on the GE-235. The GE-235 had no idea it was not running in batch mode, and the illusion of multitasking was being maintained externally.

In 1965 GE started packaging the DN-30 and GE-235 systems together as the GE-265. The GE-265 achieved fame not only for being the first commercially successful time-sharing system, but it was also the machine on which the BASIC programming language was first created.

See also
GE-400 series
GE-600 series

References

External links
 GE-200 Product Line

General Electric mainframe computers
Transistorized computers
Computer-related introductions in 1961
20-bit computers